Everton Heleno dos Santos (born 25 November 1990 in Recife), known as just Everton Heleno, is a Brazilian footballer who plays as a midfielder for Mirassol.

External links
 

1990 births
Living people
Sportspeople from Recife
Brazilian footballers
Association football midfielders
Campeonato Brasileiro Série A players
Campeonato Brasileiro Série B players
Campeonato Brasileiro Série C players
Campeonato Brasileiro Série D players
Sport Club do Recife players
Santa Cruz Futebol Clube players
Mogi Mirim Esporte Clube players
Agremiação Sportiva Arapiraquense players
Centro Sportivo Alagoano players
Atlético Clube Goianiense players
Botafogo Futebol Clube (SP) players
Botafogo Futebol Clube (PB) players
Associação Atlética Portuguesa (RJ) players
América Futebol Clube (RN) players
Mirassol Futebol Clube players